Alan Anthony Johnson (born 20 November 1956) is a former Australian rules footballer who played for Perth in the West Australian Football League (WAFL) and Melbourne in the Victorian Football League (VFL). He played five state of origin games for Western Australia.

Johnson was born in Woodside Hospital in East Fremantle, Western Australia and grew up in Palmyra. He attended Aquinas College, Perth. He made his debut for Perth in the 1975 WANFL season kicking three goals on debut. He played in the club's premiership victories in 1976 and 1977 as well as the grand final loss in 1978. In 1981, his final season at the club, he finished as the leading goalkicker and won the club best and fairest. In total he played 140 games for Perth kicking 146 goals.

A wingman recruited from Perth, Western Australia, Johnson twice won the Keith 'Bluey' Truscott Medal for Melbourne's best and fairest player, in 1983 and 1989. In 1989 he was also named in the VFL Team of the Year. Renowned for his courage and his long distance kicking, Johnson moved to a back pocket in his latter years. He played in Melbourne's 1988 VFL Grand Final. Melbourne recruited Johnson's son Chris A. Johnson under the AFL's father and son rule. Chris later moved to Carlton Football Club citing a lack of opportunities.

Johnson was inducted into the West Australian Football Hall of Fame in 2017.

Statistics

|- style="background-color: #EAEAEA"
! scope="row" style="text-align:center" | 1982
|style="text-align:center;"|
| 9 || 17 || 20 || 29 || 269 || 95 || 364 || 54 ||  || 1.2 || 1.7 || 15.8 || 5.6 || 21.4 || 3.2 ||  || 8
|-
! scope="row" style="text-align:center" | 1983
|style="text-align:center;"|
| 9 || 18 || 11 || 19 || 319 || 93 || 412 || 81 ||  || 0.6 || 1.1 || 17.7 || 5.2 || 22.9 || 4.5 ||  || 6
|- style="background:#eaeaea;"
! scope="row" style="text-align:center" | 1984
|style="text-align:center;"|
| 9 || 16 || 16 || 26 || 221 || 87 || 308 || 49 ||  || 1.0 || 1.6 || 13.8 || 5.4 || 19.3 || 3.1 ||  || 6
|-
! scope="row" style="text-align:center" | 1985
|style="text-align:center;"|
| 9 || 13 || 10 || 15 || 191 || 51 || 242 || 44 ||  || 0.8 || 1.2 || 14.7 || 3.9 || 18.6 || 3.4 ||  || 2
|- style="background:#eaeaea;"
! scope="row" style="text-align:center" | 1986
|style="text-align:center;"|
| 9 || 10 || 9 || 17 || 132 || 38 || 170 || 29 ||  || 0.9 || 1.7 || 13.2 || 3.8 || 17.0 || 2.9 ||  || 7
|-
! scope="row" style="text-align:center" | 1987
|style="text-align:center;"|
| 9 || 9 || 6 || 13 || 114 || 29 || 143 || 26 || 20 || 0.7 || 1.4 || 12.7 || 3.2 || 15.9 || 2.9 || 2.2 || 2
|- style="background:#eaeaea;"
! scope="row" style="text-align:center" | 1988
|style="text-align:center;"|
| 9 || 25 || 13 || 11 || 398 || 81 || 479 || 120 || 26 || 0.5 || 0.4 || 15.9 || 3.2 || 19.2 || 4.8 || 1.0 || 5
|-
! scope="row" style="text-align:center" | 1989
|style="text-align:center;"|
| 9 || 20 || 4 || 11 || 314 || 47 || 361 || 77 || 23 || 0.2 || 0.6 || 15.7 || 2.4 || 18.1 || 3.9 || 1.2 || 6
|-style="background:#eaeaea;"
! scope="row" style="text-align:center" | 1990
|style="text-align:center;"|
| 9 || 7 || 6 || 5 || 97 || 19 || 116 || 28 || 7 || 0.9 || 0.7 || 13.9 || 2.7 || 16.6 || 4.0 || 1.0 || 3
|- class="sortbottom"
! colspan=3| Career
! 135
! 95
! 146
! 2055
! 540
! 2595
! 508
! 76
! 0.7
! 1.1
! 15.2
! 4.0
! 19.2
! 3.8
! 1.2
! 45
|}

References

External links

1956 births
Living people
Australian rules footballers from Perth, Western Australia
Melbourne Football Club players
Keith 'Bluey' Truscott Trophy winners
Perth Football Club players
Australian people of Italian descent
Sportspeople of Italian descent
West Australian Football Hall of Fame inductees